The Feast of the Annunciation, in Greek, Ο Ευαγγελισμός της Θεοτόκου, contemporarily the Solemnity of the Annunciation, and also called Lady Day, the Feast of the Incarnation, or Conceptio Christi, commemorates the visit of the archangel Gabriel to the Virgin Mary, during which he informed her that she would be the mother of Jesus Christ, the Son of God. It is celebrated on 25 March each year. In the Roman Catholic Church, when 25 March falls during the Paschal Triduum, it is transferred forward to the first suitable day during Eastertide. In Eastern Orthodoxy and Eastern Catholicism, it is never transferred, even if it falls on Pascha (Easter). The concurrence of these two feasts is called Kyriopascha.

The Feast of the Annunciation is observed almost universally throughout Christianity, especially within Orthodoxy, Anglicanism, Catholicism, and Lutheranism. It is a major Marian feast, classified as a solemnity in the Catholic Church, a Festival in the Lutheran Churches, and a Principal Feast in the Anglican Communion. In Orthodox Christianity, because it announces the incarnation of Christ, it is counted as one of the eight great feasts of the Lord. Examples of the importance attached to the Annunciation, especially in the Roman Catholicism, are the Angelus prayer, the event's position as the first Joyful Mystery of the Dominican Rosary, and the Novena for the Feast of the Annunciation.

Biblical narrative

The "angelic salutation" is the origin of the Hail Mary prayer and the Angelus; the second part of the prayer comes from the salutation of Saint Elizabeth to Mary at the Visitation.

History
The Feast of the Annunciation was celebrated as early as the fourth or fifth century. The first certain mentions of the feast are in a canon, of the Council of Toledo in 656, where it was described as celebrated throughout the Church, and in another of the Council of Constantinople "in Trullo" in 692, which forbade the celebration of any festivals during Lent, excepting the Lord's Day (Sunday) and the Feast of the Annunciation. A Synod of Worcester, England in 1240 forbade all servile work on the feast. As this feast celebrates the Incarnation of the Second Person of the Trinity, many Church Fathers, including St. Athanasius, St. Gregory of Nyssa, and St. Augustine, have expounded on it.

From the earliest recorded history, the feast has been celebrated on 25 March, commemorating both the belief that the spring equinox was not only the day of God's act of Creation but also the beginning of Christ's redemption of that same Creation. All Christian antiquity held 25 March as the actual day of Jesus' death. The opinion that the Incarnation also took place on that date is found in the pseudo-Cyprianic work De Pascha Computus, c. 240. It says that the coming of Jesus and his death must have coincided with the creation and fall of Adam. And since the world was created in spring, Christ was also conceived and died shortly after the equinox of spring. Similar calculations are found in the early and later Middle Ages, and to them, the dates of the feast of the Annunciation and of Christmas owe their origin. Consequently the ancient martyrologies assign to 25 March the creation of Adam and the crucifixion of Jesus; also, the fall of Lucifer, the passing of Israel through the Red Sea and the immolation of Isaac. The Medieval Golden Legend identifies 25 March as not only the date of Creation and Annunciation, but also a large number of other significant events in salvation history, including Good Friday of Christ's crucifixion and death.

In the tradition of the Western Churches (Catholic Church, Anglican, Lutheran, and Western Rite Orthodoxy), the feast is moved if necessary to prevent it from falling during Holy Week or Easter Week or on a Sunday on the liturgical calendars. To avoid a Sunday before Holy Week, the next day (26 March) would be observed instead. In years such as 2016 when 25 March fell within Holy Week or Easter Week, the Annunciation is moved to the Monday after the Octave of Easter, i.e., the Monday after the Second Sunday of Easter.

In the tradition of the Eastern churches, (Eastern Orthodox, Oriental, and Eastern Catholic) the feast of the Annunciation is never moved under any circumstance. They have special combined liturgies for those years when the Annunciation coincides with another feast. In these churches, even on Good Friday a Divine Liturgy is celebrated when it coincides with the Annunciation. One of the most frequent accusations brought against New Calendarism is the fact that in the New Calendar churches (which celebrate the Annunciation according to the New Calendar, but Easter according to the Old Calendar), these special Liturgies can never be celebrated any more, since the Annunciation is always long before Holy Week on the New Calendar. The Old Calendarists believe that this impoverishes the liturgical and spiritual life of the Church

Greek Independence Day is celebrated on the feast of the Annunciation and 25 March is also a national holiday in the Lebanon.

The date is close to the vernal equinox, as Christmas is to the winter solstice; because of this the Annunciation and Christmas were two of the four "quarter days" in medieval and early modern England, which marked the divisions of the fiscal year (the other two were Midsummer Day, or the Nativity of St. John the Baptist, on 24 June, and Michaelmas, the feast day of St. Michael, on 29 September).

When the calendar system of Anno Domini was first introduced by Dionysius Exiguus in AD 525, he assigned the beginning of the new year to 25 March, because according to Christian doctrine, the age of grace began with the Incarnation of Christ at the Annunciation, on which date Jesus Christ is believed to have been conceived in the Virgin Mary by the Holy Spirit.

Pope John Paul II established 25 March as the International Day of the Unborn Child, for its commemoration of the conception of Jesus.

References

Annunciation
March observances
Marian feast days
Lutheran liturgy and worship